Best of King's X is a compilation album by American rock band King's X. The songs on this compilation, spanning a decade of discography, were selected by fans in an online poll.

Track listing
"King" – 3:04*
"Goldilox" – 4:43*
"Summerland" – 3:18*
"Pleiades" – 4:41*
"It's Love" – 4:37*
"Mr. Wilson" – 3:39*
"Black Flag" – 4:01*
"Lost in Germany" – 4:52*
"Dogman" – 4:02
"Cigarettes" – 5:52
"The Train" – 3:07
"Looking For Love" – 2:59
"Life Going By" – 4:05
"Sally" New studio track – 3:58**
"April Showers" New studio track – 4:10**
"Lover" New studio track – 2:25**
"Over My Head" (Live) – 10:04***

All songs written by Doug Pinnick, Ty Tabor and Jerry Gaskill except:
Pleiades written by Pinnick, Tabor, Gaskill and Dale Richardson:
Black Flag and Lost in Germany written by Pinnick, Tabor, Gaskill and Sam Taylor.

* Remastered by Ty Tabor at Alien Beans Studios - Katy, TX.

** Produced by Ty Tabor and King's X. Recorded by Ty Tabor at King's X Rehearsal Studios, 1996. Mixed by Ty Tabor at Alien Beans Studios - Katy, TX.

*** Recorded live at Woodstock 1994, August 12, 1994.

Credits 
Doug Pinnick – bass & vocals
Ty Tabor – guitar & vocals
Jerry Gaskill – drums & vocals

External links
Official King's X Site, accessed on July 11, 2005.
Site Francophone, accessed on July 24, 2006.

King's X albums
1997 greatest hits albums
Atlantic Records compilation albums